The following is a list of Eulophia species recognised by the Royal Botanic Gardens, Kew as at October 2018:

 Eulophia abyssinica (Ethiopia, Eritrea)
 Eulophia aculeata (Southern Africa)
 Eulophia acutilabra (South Congo to southern tropical Africa)
 Eulophia adenoglossa (Tropical and Southern Africa)
 Eulophia albobrunnea (Ethiopia)
 Eulophia aloifolia (Angola)
 Eulophia alta (Tropical Africa, southern Florida, Mexico to tropical America)
 Eulophia amblyosepala (Uganda)
 Eulophia andamanensis (Andaman and Nicobar Islands to Langkawi, Malaysia)
 Eulophia angolensis (Tropical and southern Africa)
 Eulophia angornensis (Comoros)
 Eulophia angustilabris (Thailand)
 Eulophia antunesii (Angola)
 Eulophia arenicola (South Congo to Botswana)
 Eulophia aurantiaca (Africa)
 Eulophia barteri (West tropical Africa to Central African Republic).
 Eulophia bicallosa (Taiwan, tropical Asia to North Australia)
 Eulophia biloba (Mozambique)
 Eulophia bisaccata (Mozambique ?)
 Eulophia borbonica (Réunion)
 Eulophia borneensis (Borneo, Sarawak)
 Eulophia bouliawongo (Nigeria to Angola)
 Eulophia brachycentra (Taiwan)
 Eulophia bracteosa (Assam to South Central China)
 Eulophia brenanii (South Congo to North Zambia)
 Eulophia brevipetala (Western tropical Africa)
 Eulophia buettneri (West tropical Africa to Cameroon)
 Eulophia × burundiensis (Burundi)
 Eulophia calantha (Africa)
 Eulophia calanthoides (southern Africa)
 Eulophia callichroma (Tanzania to Eswatini)
 Eulophia campbellii (India)
 Eulophia caricifolia (tropical Africa)
 Eulophia carsonii (Africa)
 Eulophia chaunanthe (Thailand)
 Eulophia chilangensis (South Congo to Angola)
 Eulophia chlorantha (Africa)
 Eulophia chrysoglossoides (North Borneo)
 Eulophia clandestina (Angola)
 Eulophia clitellifera (tropical and southern Africa, Madagascar)
 Eulophia coddii (Northern Prov. of South Africa)
 Eulophia coeloglossa (Tanzania to southern Africa)
 Eulophia cooperi (southern Africa)
 Eulophia corymbifera (Zambia)
 Eulophia cristata (West tropical Africa to Ethiopia)
 Eulophia cucullata (tropical and southern Africa, Madagascar)
 Eulophia dabia (Afghanistan to South China)
 Eulophia dactylifera (southern tropical Africa)
 Eulophia dahliana (New Guinea to Bismarck Islands)
 Eulophia densiflora (East Himalaya)
 Eulophia dentata (Luzon)
 Eulophia distans (Sierra Leone)
 Eulophia divergens (Angola)
 Eulophia dufossei (Indo-China)
 Eulophia ecristata (United States of America, Cuba)
 Eulophia elegans (Cameroon, Southwest Tanzania to Malawi)
 Eulophia ensata (Africa)
 Eulophia ephippium (Madagascar)
 Eulophia epidendraea (India, Sri Lanka)
 Eulophia epiphanoides (Southwest Tanzania)
 Eulophia euantha (Africa)
 Eulophia euglossa (West tropical Africa to Ethiopia)
 Eulophia eustachya (Africa)
 Eulophia exaltata (East Java to Lesser Sunda Islands)
 Eulophia explanata (Himalaya to India).
 Eulophia eylesii (Rwanda to southern tropical Africa)
 Eulophia eylesii var. auquieriana (Rwanda to Congo)
 Eulophia eylesii var. eylesii (South Congo to southern tropical Africa)
 Eulophia falcatiloba (Central African Republic)
 Eulophia fernandeziana (South Congo)
 Eulophia filifolia (Madagascar)
 Eulophia flava (Himalaya to Indo-China)
 Eulophia flavopurpurea (tropical Africa)
 Eulophia foliosa (Africa)
 Eulophia fridericii (Tanzania to Northern Prov. of S. Africa)
 Eulophia galeoloides (tropical Africa)
 Eulophia gastrodioides (southern tropical Africa)
 Eulophia gonychila (Tanzania to S. Trop. Africa)
 Eulophia gracilis (West tropical Africa to Angola)
 Eulophia graminea (tropical and subtropical Asia to Marianas, Guam).
 Eulophia grandidieri (Madagascar)
 Eulophia guineensis (Cape Verde, tropical Africa, Arabian Peninsula)
 Eulophia herbacea (Himalaya to Indo-China)
 Eulophia hereroensis (southern tropical and southern Africa)
 Eulophia hians (Africa)
 Eulophia hians var. hians (Africa)
 Eulophia hians var. inaequalis (Africa)
 Eulophia hians var. nutans(Africa)
 Eulophia hirschbergii (South Congo to Zambia)
 Eulophia hologlossa (East Madagascar)
 Eulophia holubii (Africa)
 Eulophia horsfallii - purple swamp orchid (tropical and southern Africa)
 Eulophia huttonii (South Africa)
 Eulophia ibityensis (Southeast Madagascar)
 Eulophia javanica (Western and Central Java)
 Eulophia juncifolia (West tropical Africa to Chad)
 Eulophia kamarupa (Assam)
 Eulophia katangensis (Tanzania to southern tropical Africa)
 Eulophia kyimbilae (Ethiopia to Botswana)
 Eulophia latilabris (Nigeria to Sudan and Botswana)
 Eulophia laurentii (Congo)
 Eulophia leachii (southern tropical and southern Africa)
 Eulophia lejolyana (South Congo)
 Eulophia lenbrassii (Papua New Guinea)
 Eulophia leonensis (West tropical Africa to Uganda)
 Eulophia leontoglossa (South Africa)
 Eulophia litoralis (Southern Africa)
 Eulophia livingstoneana (Africa, Comoros)
 Eulophia longisepala (Burundi to southern tropical Africa, KwaZulu-Natal)
 Eulophia macaulayi (Angola to Zambia)
 Eulophia mackinnonii (East Himalaya)
 Eulophia macowanii (East Cape Prov. to KwaZulu-Natal)
 Eulophia macra (Southeast and South Madagascar)
 Eulophia macrantha (southern tropical Africa)
 Eulophia macrobulbon (Indo-China)
 Eulophia malangana (Tanzania to southern tropical Africa)
 Eulophia mangenotiana (North Madagascar)
 Eulophia mannii (Sikkim to Assam)
 Eulophia massokoensis (Tanzania to Zambia)
 Eulophia mechowii (Africa)
 Eulophia meleagris (East Cape Prov. to KwaZulu-Natal)
 Eulophia milnei (Africa)
 Eulophia monantha (Yunnan)
 Eulophia monile (tropical Africa)
 Eulophia monotropis (Tanzania to Zimbabwe)
 Eulophia monticola (southern tropical Africa)
 Eulophia montis-elgonis (Africa)
 Eulophia moratii (Île des Pins of New Caledonia)
 Eulophia mumbwaensis (West Tanzania to southern tropical Africa)
 Eulophia nervosa (Central Madagascar)
 Eulophia nicobarica (Nicobar Islands)
 Eulophia nuda (Asia, Western Pacific)
 Eulophia nuttii (Africa)
 Eulophia nyasae (Tanzania to southern tropical Africa)
 Eulophia obscura (Burundi to southern tropical Africa)
 Eulophia obstipa (Tanzania to Angola)
 Eulophia obtusa (Bangladesh, North India)
 Eulophia ochreata (India)
 Eulophia odontoglossa (Tropical and southern Africa)
 Eulophia orthoplectra (tropical Africa)
 Eulophia ovalis (Kenya to southern Africa)
 Eulophia ovalis var. bainesii (Kenya to southern Africa)
 Eulophia ovalis var. ovalis (Zimbabwe to southern Africa)
 Eulophia parilamellata (Congo)
 Eulophia parviflora (southern tropical and South Africa)
 Eulophia parvilabris (southern Africa)
 Eulophia parvula (Nigeria to Sudan and Zimbabwe)
 Eulophia pauciflora (Indo-China)
 Eulophia penduliflora (tropical Africa)
 Eulophia perrieri (Northwest Madagascar)
 Eulophia petersii (Eritrea to southern Africa, Arabian Peninsula)
 Eulophia × pholelana (South Africa)
 Eulophia pileata (Central Madagascar)
 Eulophia plantaginea (Mauritius, Madagascar, Réunion)
 Eulophia platypetala (South Cape Prov. of S. Africa)
 Eulophia pocsii (Rwanda)
 Eulophia pottsii (florida)
 Eulophia pratensis (India)
 Eulophia promensis (Darjiling to Indo-China)
 Eulophia protearum (Angola)
 Eulophia pulchra (Africa, Western Pacific)
 Eulophia pyrophila (tropical Africa)
 Eulophia ramifera (West tropical Africa)
 Eulophia ramosa (West Madagascar)
 Eulophia rara (Africa)
 Eulophia reticulata (Madagascar)
 Eulophia rhodesiaca (Tanzania to southern tropical Africa)
 Eulophia richardsiae (North Zambia)
 Eulophia rolfeana (South Congo to southern tropical Africa)
 Eulophia rugulosa (Tanzania to Angola)
 Eulophia rutenbergiana (Madagascar)
 Eulophia ruwenzoriensis (Africa, Soputh America)
 Eulophia sabulosa (Tanzania to southern tropical Africa)
 Eulophia saxicola (Zambia to Zimbabwe)
 Eulophia schaijesii (South Congo)
 Eulophia schweinfurthii (Ethiopia to Northern Prov. of South Africa)
 Eulophia segawae (Taiwan)
 Eulophia seleensis (Burundi to southern tropical Africa)
 Eulophia siamensis (Thailand)
 Eulophia sooi (Guangxi)
 Eulophia sordida (West tropical Africa to Cameroon)
 Eulophia speciosa (Ethiopia to South Africa, Southwest Arabian Peninsula)
 Eulophia stachyodes (Nigeria to Ethiopia and Mozambique)
 Eulophia stenopetala (Central Bhutan)
 Eulophia stenoplectra (Ghana, South Sudan, Uganda)
 Eulophia streptopetala (Eritrea to South Africa, Southwest Arabian Peninsula)
 Eulophia streptopetala var. rueppelii (Ethiopia, Yemen)
 Eulophia streptopetala var. stenophylla (East tropical Africa)
 Eulophia streptopetala var. streptopetala (Eritrea to southern Africa)
 Eulophia stricta (Philippines to Sulawesi)
 Eulophia subsaprophytica (Tanzania to southern tropical Africa)
 Eulophia subulata (Africa)
 Eulophia suzannae (Congo)
 Eulophia sylviae (South Congo)
 Eulophia tabularis (Africa)
 Eulophia taitensis (East tropical Africa)
 Eulophia taiwanensis (Southeast Taiwan)
 Eulophia tanganyikensis (Burundi to Zimbabwe)
 Eulophia tenella (southern tropical and South Africa)
 Eulophia thomsonii (Africa)
 Eulophia tricristata (South Congo to Angola)
 Eulophia trilamellata (Africa)
 Eulophia tuberculata (Tanzania to southern Africa)
 Eulophia ukingensis (Tanzania)
 Eulophia venosa (Maluku to Queensland)
 Eulophia venulosa (Tanzania to southern tropical Africa)
 Eulophia vinosa (Africa)
 Eulophia walleri (Africa)
 Eulophia welwitschii (Africa)
 Eulophia wendlandiana (Madagascar)
 Eulophia zeyheriana (South Africa)
 Eulophia zollingeri (tropical and subtropical Asia to Queensland)

 Transferred to Orthochilus 
After a molecular phylogeny published in 2014 revealed that the genus Eulophia was paraphyletic unless a clade containing Orthochilus was recognized, 34 species and one subspecies were transferred to the resurrected genus Orthochilus, which included many Eulophia and all Pteroglossaspis taxa. This reduced the number of Eulophia species from 201 to 165. The authors also suggested recognizing Oeceoclades pulchra instead of Eulophia pulchra. The taxa formerly recognized in Eulophia include:

 Orthochilus abyssinicus, formerly Eulophia abyssinica Orthochilus aculeatus, formerly Eulophia aculeata Orthochilus adenoglossus, formerly Eulophia adenoglossa Orthochilus albobrunneus, formerly Eulophia albobrunnea Orthochilus aurantiacus, formerly Eulophia aurantiaca Orthochilus carsonii, formerly Eulophia carsonii Orthochilus chloranthus, formerly Eulophia chlorantha Orthochilus clandestinus, formerly Eulophia clandestina Orthochilus corymbosus, formerly Eulophia corymbosa Orthochilus distans, formerly Eulophia distans Orthochilus ecristatus, formerly Eulophia ecristata Orthochilus ensatus, formerly Eulophia ensata Orthochilus euanthus, formerly Eulophia euantha Orthochilus eustachyus, formerly Eulophia eustachya Orthochilus foliosus, formerly Eulophia foliosa Orthochilus holubii, formerly Eulophia holubii Orthochilus leontoglossus, formerly Eulophia leontoglossa Orthochilus litoralis, formerly Eulophia litoralis Orthochilus mechowii, formerly Eulophia mechowii Orthochilus milnei, formerly Eulophia milnei Orthochilus montis-elgonis, formerly Eulophia montis-elgonis Orthochilus nuttii, formerly Eulophia nuttii Orthochilus odontoglossus, formerly Eulophia odontoglossa Orthochilus pottsii, formerly Pteroglossaspis pittsii Orthochilus rarus, formerly Eulophia rara Orthochilus rutenbergianus, formerly Eulophia rutenbergiana Orthochilus ruwenzoriensis, formerly Eulophia ruwenzoriensis Orthochilus subulatus, formerly Eulophia subulata Orthochilus tabularis, formerly Eulophia tabularis Orthochilus thomsonii, formerly Eulophia thomsonii Orthochilus trilamellatus, formerly Eulophia trilamellata Orthochilus vinosus, formerly Eulophia vinosa Orthochilus walleri, formerly Eulophia walleri Orthochilus welwitschii, formerly Eulophia welwitschii''

References

Eulophia
Eulophia